Aik Thi Laila is a Pakistani television series directed by Yasir Hussain, and written by Faiza Iftikhar. It stars Iqra Aziz, Hussain, Faysal Quraishi, Hassan Ahmed and Maham Amir with Sheheryar Munawar in a cameo appearance. It aired from 8 December 2022 to 12 January 2023, on Express Entertainment.

Cast 

 Iqra Aziz as Laila
 Yasir Hussain as Inspector Sajid
 Faysal Quraishi as Azeem Ullah
 Inaya Khan as Saba Azeem Ullah
 Gul e Rana as Nuzhat Keenchi
 Nayyar Ejaz as Hafeez
 Hassan Ahmed as Fareed
 Maham Amir as Inspector Rukaiyya
 Usama Bin Ateeq as Kashif
 Fareeha Jabeen as Kashif's mother
 Sheheryar Munawar as Qais (cameo)
 Asif Latta

Production

Background and development 
On 11 August 2022, it reported that Aziz will feature in Hussain's directorial Aik Thi Laila, which is written by screenwriter Faiza Iftikhar. The other cast members were also revealed along with the genre of the series, which will be murder-mystery. Express Tribune reported that the series will revolve around a disappearance case, much like Dua Zehra case. The series marked Aziz's comeback to television after 2 years. In conservation with Daily Pakistan, she further reveled that series will have only 5 episodes.

Promotion and release 
The poster of the series featuring the cast members was unveiled by the network on 12 November. The first teaser of the series was released on 15 November 2022.

References 

2022 Pakistani television series debuts